Gábor Kovács (born 4 September 1987 in Budapest) is a professional Hungarian footballer currently plays for Diósgyőr.

External links
 HLSZ 

1987 births
Living people
Footballers from Budapest
Hungarian footballers
Association football defenders
Vasas SC players
FC Winterthur players
Pécsi MFC players
Egri FC players
Paksi FC players
Diósgyőri VTK players
Nemzeti Bajnokság I players
Hungarian expatriate footballers
Expatriate footballers in Switzerland
Hungarian expatriate sportspeople in Switzerland
FC Kreuzlingen players